Šuštar is a Slovenian surname. Notable people with the surname include:

Alojzij Šuštar (1920–2007), Slovenian Roman Catholic prelate
Franc Šuštar (born 1959), Slovenian Roman Catholic prelate
Predrag Šustar (born 1970), Croatian professor and politician

See also
Shushtar, a city in Iran

Slovene-language surnames